Michael Freedman has won nine Emmy Awards.  His career at ABC began in 1948 and he "pioneered the use of live, hand-held video cameras for network coverage of news and sporting events."

References

Year of birth missing (living people)
Living people
American cinematographers